There are several rivers named Capivara River in Brazil:

 Capivara River (Araçuaí River tributary)
 Capivara River (Goiás)
 Capivara River (Paraná)
 Capivara River (Piauí)
 Capivara River (Roraima)
 Capivara River (Santa Tereza River tributary)
 Capivara River (São Paulo)
 Capivara River (Sergipe), a river of Sergipe
 Capivara River (Tocantins River tributary)

See also 
 Capivari River (disambiguation)
 Capivara, the Portuguese name of the rodent Capybara
 Capivaras River, Santa Catarina, Brazil